Card standard(s) may refer to any amount of numbers of ISO standards related to smartcards.
 ISO/IEC 7810 Identification cards — Physical characteristics
 ISO/IEC 7812 Identification cards — Identification of issuers
 ISO/IEC 7816 Identification cards — Integrated circuit cards
 ISO/IEC 14443 Identification cards — Contactless integrated circuit cards — Proximity cards

See also
List of ISO standards

Smart cards